Robert "Big Mojo" Elem (January 22, 1928 – February 5, 1997) was an American Chicago blues bass guitarist and singer. Although he recorded only one studio album in his long career, Elem was a part of the Chicago blues scene for over forty years. He variously backed Arthur "Big Boy" Spires, Lester Davenport, Freddie King, Magic Sam, Junior Wells, Shakey Jake Harris, Jimmy Dawkins, Luther Allison, and Otis Rush.

He was noted as a "born entertainer whose joking and acting on stage appeal to club audiences". Elem's energetic on-stage persona underpinned his lengthy performing career.

Biography
Elem was born in Itta Bena, Mississippi, United States. He studied both Robert Nighthawk and Ike Turner playing live, which inspired his own early rhythm guitar playing. By 1948, Elem had relocated to Chicago, Illinois, where he spent the rest of his life. Shortly after arriving, Elem picked up employment backing Arthur "Big Boy" Spires and then Lester Davenport. To avoid being in a large batch of jobbing rhythm guitarists all seeking work, Elem moved over to playing the electric bass guitar. In 1956, this instrument was something of a rarity in Chicago, and Elem formed a band with the harmonica player Earl Payton, and a young Freddie King on lead guitar. The same year, King recorded his debut single for El-Bee Records. The A-side was "Country Boy", a duet with Margaret Whitfield. The B-side, "That's What You Think", was a King vocal. Both tracks featured the guitar of Robert Lockwood Jr., and the bass playing of Elem. That relative success saw King installed as the bandleader, but Elem stayed mostly with King for the next eight years. During the 1950s and 1960s, Elem regularly appeared in Chicago's burgeoning club environment, mainly on the West Side. He variously backed Magic Sam, Junior Wells, Shakey Jake Harris, Jimmy Dawkins, and Luther Allison, in addition to having a brief spell in Otis Rush's backing band.

Elem had a relatively high-pitched voice, and his bass playing eschewed standard walking bass patterns, rather utilising a single-note based groove. However, as a dedicated family man, Elem was reluctant to swap his day job for the vagaries of full-time musician status.

In 1978, Elem recorded his debut album, Mojo Boogie, which was released on Storyville Records. The collection had a mixture of blues standards, with some original numbers co-written by Elem and his record producer George Paulus. Elem was backed on the recording by the guitarists Willie James Lyons and Wayne Bennett, with Fred Below on the drums. The album was subsequently reissued in 1994 on Paulus's own St. George Records. Throughout this period Elem continued to perform locally, becoming well known for his own rendition of J. B. Lenoir's track, "The Mojo".

Elem died in February 1997 in Chicago, aged 69.

Discography

Albums

With Luther Allison
Love Me Mama (Delmark, 1969)
With Magic Sam
Live at the Avant Garde (Delmark, 1968 [2013])

See also
List of Chicago blues musicians

References

External links
Obituaries: Robert "Big Mojo" Elem, Living Blues, Vol. 28, No. 4, pp. 50–51

YouTube live recording

1928 births
1997 deaths
People from Itta Bena, Mississippi
American blues guitarists
American male guitarists
Chicago blues musicians
Blues musicians from Mississippi
Guitarists from Mississippi
20th-century American guitarists
Electric blues musicians
20th-century American male musicians